Bjørn Blakstad (9 January 1926 – 11 July 2012) was a Norwegian diplomat.

He was born in Hisøy, and is a cand.jur. by education. He started working for the Norwegian Ministry of Foreign Affairs in 1952. He became a deputy under-secretary of state in the Ministry of Foreign Affairs in 1973. He then served as an ambassor; to Japan from 1976 to 1981, to Spain from 1981 to 1988 and to the Netherlands from 1988 to 1994. He died in July 2012 in Arendal.

References

1926 births
2012 deaths
People from Arendal
Norwegian civil servants
Ambassadors of Norway to Japan
Ambassadors of Norway to Spain
Ambassadors of Norway to the Netherlands